IG Group is an online trading provider with 313,000 active traders, offering access to spread betting and CFD trading, which allow traders to bet on the direction of equities, bonds and currencies without owning the underlying assets. Established in 1974 by Stuart Wheeler, it has a market value of £2.9 billion and offers trading in 17,000 investment markets. IG is regulated by the FCA, the UK's financial authority body. It is listed on the London Stock Exchange and is a constituent of the FTSE 250 Index. The company is based in London and employs 1,950 staff.

History

Founding and early years (1974– 2000)
The company was founded in 1974 by Stuart Wheeler as a spread betting business under the name IG Index (an abbreviation for Investors Gold Index) which allowed people to trade gold prices as an index instead of buying the physical commodity. In July 2000, shares in the newly named IG Group plc were first listed on the London Stock Exchange.

Expansion (2001– 2010)
In July 2002, IG Group commenced trading in Australia after a change in the country's financial services legislation made it possible to offer contracts for difference to Australian residents. IG Group took the opportunity to acquire its founder's shares, and those of certain other long-standing shareholders, in a management buy-out (backed by private equity firm CVC Capital Partners) which valued the company at £143 million; IG Group plc's listing on the London Stock Exchange was subsequently cancelled on 7 November 2003.

In May 2005, after two years of private ownership, IG Group and CVC Capital Partners re-floated the company on the main list of the London Stock Exchange with a valuation of £393 million. In October 2008, IG Group acquired FXOnline Japan KK, a Japanese retail FX business.

In 2007, it purchased HedgeStreet, a small US based company that developed an electronic marketplace that allows online retail investors to trade financial derivatives. It renamed this the North American Derivatives Exchange or (NADEX) and has been attempting to use this to develop a product that looks like its binary option "digital 100s" product but that meets the US financial regulations and can be offered to retail traders. In 2007, IG has also been labeled as a gambling company by some of authoritative media. The Telegraph's warning report stated that although such spread-betting companies as IG have been regulated by the UK financial regulator, "no amount of regulation will help you if you get your bets wrong, so in that respect there is no doubt it is risky, and you should make sure you know what you are doing before you get involved". In May 2010, it obtained permission from the US Commodity Futures Trading Commission to make various technical changes that move in that direction. Later in 2010, IG Index, IG Group's spread betting firm, was hit with a claim for €25 million by three former clients of defunct Scottish trading firm Echelon Wealth Management for unspecified losses.

Recent developments (2011–present)
In June 2011, IG Markets shut down its traditional fixed-odds sports service extrabet, which had an emphasis on in-play betting. The fixed odds sport service was shut down to focus on financial wagers, after failing to find a buyer for the whole unit. In September 2014, the company started its own online stockbroking platform offering some 4,500 stocks.

In January 2015, the Swiss National Bank announced that it would be discontinuing its minimum exchange rate policy. IG customers incurred losses of £18.4 million after it happened. They accused the company of breaching UK regulations by acting out of self-interest and alleged a failure by company to provide the best execution to everyone. In October 2015, after claims by many of the firm's clients, IG "accepted a ruling by the UK’s Financial Ombudsman Service that it should compensate customers for money lost during a rapid appreciation of the Swiss franc in January".

In September 2016, IG Group acquired DailyFX, a foreign exchange trading news and research portal, from FXCM for $40 million. Later, in December, Peter Hetheringon, the CEO of the company, criticised the Financial Conduct Authority in the UK after it announced new measures to overhaul the industry, publicly blaming the regulator for weakness in some aspects of implementation and its lack of understanding of what the proposed changes could bring.

In December 2016, the FCA questioned whether binary bets "serve a genuine investment need" and defined them as more akin to gambling. Aside from most consumers losing money, the FCA's other concerns included the addictive nature of binary options betting, and inherent conflicts of interest. "Since 2012 there have been a reported 2,605 victims who lost a total of £59.4m on binary options scams – an average of nearly £23,000 each". In 2017, investors lost more than £87,000 a day on binary option scams alone.

In January 2017, IG group announced their decision on withdrawal of the binary options betting product, admitting that the arrival of the regulator to the market would significantly worsen the company's state of affairs. The director of IG corporate affairs stated: "I think that product will come under regulatory pressure in the future. That does not influence our view – it's simply a fact." At the same time, analysts stated that the IG's binary option withdrawal has been more akin to provocation: "It was a pre-emptive measure to mitigate further regulation".

In April 2017, IG Group launched IG Smart Portfolios – a suite of ETF investment portfolios created in partnership with BlackRock, marking the company's first move into online wealth management. In October 2018, IG Group appointed June Felix as CEO and, in February 2019, IG Group launched IG US to enter US market.

Leadership
Following his tenure as Chief Financial Officer, Tim Hawkins was appointed CEO in October 2006, retiring 9 years later in 2015. Following the departure of Tim Howkins, Peter Hetherington became CEO in October 2015, having started at the company as a graduate trainee in January 1994. He later stepped down in September 2018.

In October 2018, IG Group appointed June Felix as CEO. Felix served as a non-executive director for three years before joining the board. As of October 2020, Felix also serves on the board at Relx PLC.

tastytrade
IG acquired tastytrade in June 2021 for $1bn, a trading platform catering to individual investors. Privately owned tastytrade was co-founded in 2011 by Tom Sosnoff who also founded thinkorswim, a brokerage firm that was acquired by TD Ameritrade for $606million in 2009, and Dough, Inc. Subsidiary tastyworks was launched in January 2017 as a brokerage arm of tastytrade.

Nadex Sale
In December 2021, IG brokered a deal for the sale of North American Derivatives Exchange (Nadex) and a 39% stake in Small Exchange Inc to Foris DAX Markets Inc, which trades as Crypto.com, completing the $216 million sale in March 2022. Nadex is a U.S. derivatives exchange regulated by the Commodity Futures Trading Commission encompassing short term binary options.

India 
In September 2022, the Reserve Bank of India (RBI), India's central bank, released a list of 34 forex trading online platforms, in which IG Markets was listed as an illegal platform in India.

ESG Investing

In 2019, IG partnered with Teach First to train 16 teachers in STEM subjects (Science, Technology, Engineering and Mathematics). This partnership was extended to create a £2 million fund supporting children in disadvantaged areas, specifically affected by the negative impacts of the Covid-19 pandemic on the education system. IG Group launched its environmental, social, and governance (ESG) strategy, Brighter Future, in 2020.

IG's Brighter Future Fund launched in early 2020 at the start of the Covid-19 pandemic, focusing on the education and development of young people irrespective of race, gender or socioeconomic background.

Operations
In 2012, IG Group consolidated its business in the UK under one brand, IG. IG Group is now, therefore, the sole trading name of the operating companies:
IG Index offers spread betting on financial markets as well a binary options under the supervision of the Financial Conduct Authority in the UK.
IG Markets offers CFDs on a similar range of financial markets. IG Markets Limited is authorised by the Financial Conduct Authority in the UK.

Controversies

Platform crashes 
In 2021, FinanceFeeds and Financial Magnates reported that IG Group's system, supposedly accustomed to low volatility periods, faced frequent outages at the time of higher-than-usual trade volumes. Such crashes left clients unable to control the positions, leading to loss of funds. FinanceFeeds also mentioned that during the January 2021 outage, IG Group provided no customer support (up to not answering the phone calls) but immediately reacted to request for commentary to protect its public image and deny the issues raised by the clients.

2021 short squeeze 

In February 2021, IG Group and 34 other brokers and hedge funds were targeted by an antitrust class action lawsuit for allegedly conspiring against non-professional investors when GameStop short squeeze took place. According to the plaintiff, the defendants hatched an uncompetitive scheme to limit the trading of certain securities after the failure of their highly speculative short-selling strategies, thus violating state antitrust laws.

Sponsorship
During its history, IG Group signed some notable sponsorship deals:

 The company sponsored Getafe CF football club in the 2010-2011 Spanish season.
 In November 2010, IG Markets signed a sponsorship deal to support Team Sky professional cycling team in 2011.
 In December 2010, IG Markets announced sponsorship of two stages of Santos Tour Down Under cycling race in 2011.
 In October 2013, IG signed a sponsorship deal with Harlequin rugby team for the next three years. In September 2014, the deal was updated to make IG one of three major sponsors for the team.
 In May 2015, IG Group became a partner of Melbourne Football Club for 2015 and 2016.
 In May 2021, IG Group became a partner of England Cricket Club for 2021 and 2022.

See also
FTSE 250 Index
Forex

References

Financial services companies based in the City of London
Companies listed on the London Stock Exchange
Financial derivative trading companies
Financial services companies established in 1974
Foreign exchange companies
Online brokerages
1974 establishments in England